Kel Johari Rice Mitchell (born August 25, 1978) is an American actor and stand-up comedian. He was an original cast member of the Nickelodeon sketch comedy series All That for its first five seasons (1994–1999), where he was often paired as one-half of a comedic duo opposite Kenan Thompson, most notably the sketch Mavis and Clavis. His role as Ed in the All That sketch was reprised for the 1997 theatrical film Good Burger. He portrayed Kel Kimble on the Nickelodeon sitcom Kenan & Kel from 1996 to 2000. Mitchell was nominated for the Daytime Emmy Award for Outstanding Performer in an Animated Program for his role as T-Bone in the 2000s animated series Clifford the Big Red Dog in both 2001 and 2002 respectively. From 2015 to 2019, he starred as Double G on the Nickelodeon comedy series Game Shakers.

Early life 
Mitchell was born on August 25, 1978 in Chicago, Illinois, and is from the South Side. He attended Chicago Vocational High School and took drama classes at the ETA Creative Arts Foundation. He has two sisters, Kenyatta and Kyra.

Career
Mitchell started his acting career alongside Kenan Thompson at the age of 15, in the Nickelodeon comedy sketch series, All That, from 1994 to 1999. He and Thompson worked on the series Kenan & Kel from 1996 to 2000. They starred in the 1997 film, Good Burger, which grew out of one of Mitchell's sketches from All That. The duo appeared together in an episode of Sister, Sister with Tia and Tamera Mowry, four episodes of The Steve Harvey Show, and in a special two-part episode of Cousin Skeeter. They were also featured in an episode of Sabrina, the Teenage Witch.

Outside of his ventures with Kenan Thompson, Mitchell provided the voice of a mild-mannered and playful dog named T-Bone in the children's cartoon series Clifford the Big Red Dog, alongside John Ritter, from 2000 to 2003. Additionally, he made an appearance in the 2004 Kanye West music video "All Falls Down" as a valet. Mitchell co-hosted Dance 360 with Fredro Starr; the show lasted for only one season. From 2005 until 2006, Mitchell portrayed Manny Sellers in the sitcom One on One, and in 2007 Mitchell starred in BET's Take the Cake. Some of his other credits include Honeydripper and Mystery Men. He auditioned for Saturday Night Live in 2003, but lost to his Kenan & Kel co-star Kenan Thompson. In 2006, Mitchell was the subject of a death hoax, when a rumor was spread around Myspace.

In March 2008, he filmed his writing and producing debut, Dance Fu, in which he also starred as the lead role. Also in 2008, Mitchell appeared in two Detroit-based stage productions, Affairs and Laundromat, the latter written by Carlos Faison and also starred comedian Buddy Lewis, Leanne "Lelee" Lyons of R&B group SWV, celebrity impersonator/stage actor Matt Macis, and vocalist and performer Lauren "Lexxi" Alexis. Mitchell was a part of G4's Attack of the Show!, playing various characters. He also has a recurring role on the PBS Kids show Curious George.

Mitchell appeared at the 2011 Comikaze Expo with several of his All That cast members, and has appeared in numerous panels of the same kind since, including at New York Comic-Con in 2015, and filmed segments with them for the show's 22nd anniversary celebration on The Splat in April 2016. Mitchell guest starred on Sam & Cat as rapper Peezy B, in the episode "#Peezy B".

Mitchell was a cast member on Dan Schneider's sitcom, Game Shakers, which premiered on Nickelodeon on September 12, 2015. Mitchell played the role of rap superstar and business partner of the Game Shakers company, Double G. Mitchell also starred in the Cartoon Network's Loiter Squad in 2015, and TV One's Love That Girl!, as well as writing and directing the inspirational film, She Is Not My Sister and several music videos.

On September 23, 2015, Mitchell appeared on The Tonight Show Starring Jimmy Fallon in a skit featuring his iconic role as Ed from Good Burger. Mitchell was also reunited with his former Kenan & Kel costar Kenan Thompson, who reprised his role as "Lester Oakes, Construction Worker". They later competed against one another in an episode of the revived Nickelodeon game show Double Dare that aired in November 2018. They also teamed as executive producers for the reboot of All That which premiered in June 2019 and ran until 2020. Mitchell also returned as a recurring cast member. 

Mitchell hosted the TV series Tails of Valor, which focused on true stories of service animals whose work has changed people's lives. Also in 2019, Mitchell competed as a celebrity contestant on the 28th season of Dancing with the Stars, and finished in second place. Starting in December 2020, Mitchell appeared as a panelists for MTV's Ridiculousness spinoff, Deliciousness.

In 2022, Mitchell released a book entitled, Blessed Mode: 90 Days to Level Up Your Faith, available physically, digitally, and as an audiobook. A song titled, "Blessed Mode", was later released to streaming services like Spotify and iTunes. He and wife Asia also competed in an episode of Guy's Grocery Games against Ross Mathews. 

The same year, Mitchell would team up with Thompson once more on Saturday Night Live for the "Kenan and Kelly" sketch in the December 3, 2022 episode hosted by Keke Palmer. He also starred in the VH1 television movie All I Didn't Want For Christmas with Gabourey Sidibe, which premiered on December 7.

Personal life
Mitchell was married to Tyisha Hampton from 1999 until their divorce in 2005. They have two children together, a son and a daughter. Tyisha Mitchell helped out his career by creating Kel Videos Live (KVL), and Ganked, which she wrote and produced for Kel.

Mitchell married rapper Asia Lee on February 25, 2012. They have two children together, a daughter born in July 2017 and a son born in October 2020.

Mitchell and Lee received an award from the Carson Black Chamber in 2016 for their show The Back House Party. He is the spokesperson for Black College Expo.

He is a convert to Christianity. In December 2019, he became a youth pastor at Spirit Food Christian Center in Winnetka, Los Angeles.

Filmography

Television

Film

Music videos

Discography

Singles

Source:
 1995: "Chillin" (by Aftermath feat. Kel Mitchell) from All That live performance on April 1, 1995
 1996: "Watch Me Do My Thing" (by Immature featuring Smooth and Kel Mitchell) from All That: The Album
 1997: "We're All Dudes" (by Less Than Jake and Kel Mitchell) from the Good Burger soundtrack
 1999: "Who Are Those Mystery Men" (by Kel Mitchell and the M.A.F.T. Emcees featuring Romaine Jones and Simbi Khali) from the Mystery Men soundtrack
 1999: "Pedal to the Steel" (by Youngstown featuring Kel Mitchell) from Youngstown's Let's Roll
 2015: "Kel Mitchell" (by Spec featuring Asia Lee and Kel Mitchell) from Spec Vacancy
 2022: "Blessed Mode" (by Kel Mitchell featuring nobigdyl and Scootie Wop)

References

External links
 
 

1978 births
Living people
20th-century American male actors
20th-century Christians
21st-century American male actors
21st-century Christians
African-American Christians
African-American stand-up comedians
African-American male actors
African-American musicians
American male child actors
American male comedians
American male film actors
American male television actors
American male voice actors
American sketch comedians
American stand-up comedians
Comedians from Illinois
Male actors from Chicago
Musicians from Chicago
Santa Monica College alumni
20th-century American comedians
21st-century American comedians
20th-century African-American people
21st-century African-American people